The 2017–18 West Coast Conference men's basketball season began with practices in September 2017 and ended with the 2018 West Coast Conference men's basketball tournament March 2018. This was the 67th season for WCC men's basketball, and the 29th under its current name of "West Coast Conference". The conference was founded in 1952 as the California Basketball Association, became the West Coast Athletic Conference in 1956, and dropped the word "Athletic" in 1989.

Head coaches

Coaching changes

Coaches 

Notes:
 Year at school includes 2017–18 season.
 Overall and WCC records are from time at current school and are through the beginning of the 2017–18 season.

Preseason

Preseason poll

All-WCC Preseason Men's Basketball team

Rankings

WCC regular season

Conference matrix

All-WCC awards and teams 
On February 27, the conference announced conference awards.

Postseason

West Coast Conference tournament

NCAA tournament

See also 
2017–18 NCAA Division I men's basketball season
West Coast Conference men's basketball tournament
2017–18 West Coast Conference women's basketball season
West Coast Conference women's basketball tournament
2018 West Coast Conference women's basketball tournament

References